Pfreimd is a town in the district of Schwandorf, in Bavaria, Germany. It is situated on the river Naab, 19 km north of Schwandorf, and 20 km south of Weiden in der Oberpfalz. It is also close to the border with the Czech Republic.

Mayor
Arnold Kimmerl (ÖDP) (Ecological Democratic Party) won the election in 2008. In 2014, Richard Tischler (Free Voters) won the election, and again in 2020.

References

Schwandorf (district)